Events from the year 1648 in art.

Events
 Académie royale de peinture et de sculpture founded in Paris.
 Carlo Ridolfi publishes a biography of Titian and other Venetian artists, Le maraviglie dell'Arte ovvero, Le vite degli Illustri Pittori Veneti e dello Stato.

Paintings

 Claude Lorrain
 Seaport with The Embarkation of the Queen of Sheba
 Landscape with Dancing Figures (The Mill)
 Landscape with Paris and Oenone
 Marriage of Isaac and Rebekah
 Peter Lely - Portrait of Charles I of England and the Duke of York
 Nicolas Poussin
 The Funeral of Phocion
 The Holy Family on the Steps
 Landscape with the Ashes of Phocion
 Seven Sacraments, Second series (completed)
 Gerard ter Borch - The Ratification of the Treaty of Münster, 15 May 1648
 Bartholomeus van der Helst - Banquet of the Amsterdam Civic Guard in Celebration of the Peace of Münster

Births
March 31 - Sebastiaen van Aken, Flemish historical painter (died 1722)
April 4 - Grinling Gibbons, English master wood carver (died 1721)
May 23 - Johan Teyler, Dutch Golden Age painter and engraver (died 1709)
August 22 - Gerard Hoet, Dutch Golden Age painter (died 1733)
October 29 - John Verelst, Dutch Golden Age portrait painter (died 1734)
date unknown
Giovanni Raffaele Badaracco, Italian painter (died 1726)
Ambrogio Besozzi, Italian painter (died 1706)
Bartolomeo Bimbi, Florentine painter of still lifes (died 1723)
Gabriel de la Corte, Spanish painter (died 1694)
Marcantonio Franceschini, Italian painter of religious and mythological subjects (died 1729)
Jean Mauger, French medallist (died 1712)
Johannes Skraastad, woodcarver (died 1700)
probable - Paul Strudel, Austrian sculptor, architect, engineer, and painter (died 1708)

Deaths
February - Lawrence Hilliard, English miniature painter (born 1582)
May 25 - Antioine Le Nain, French painter of the Le Nain family of painters (born 1599)
October 15 - Simone Cantarini, Italian painter and etcher of the Bolognese School of painting (born 1612)
December - Peter Oliver, English miniaturist (born 1594)
December 18 - Hendrick Goudt, Dutch painter (born 1583)
date unknown
Francisco Agullo, Spanish painter (born unknown)
Cesare Bassano,  Italian painter and engraver (born 1584)
Antonio de Puga, Spanish Baroque painter (born 1602)
Zacharias Paulusz, Dutch Golden Age portrait painter (born 1580)
Andries Jacobsz Stock, Flemish engraver, printmaker and illustrator (born 1580)
Jacob van Geel, Dutch Golden Age painter (born 1585)
Diego Vidal de Liendo, Spanish painter (born 1622)

 
Years of the 17th century in art
1640s in art